Baillaud is a lunar impact crater that is located near the north limb of the Moon. The rim of the crater has been eroded and worn by a long history of impacts, leaving a hilly ridge surrounding the interior. The crater Euctemon is intruding into the rim to the northeast, and the rim bulges outward to the northwest. At the south end of the crater is a gap connecting to the lava-flooded surface to the south.

The interior of Baillaud has been submerged by past lava flows, leaving a flat surface that is marked only by many craterlets and the satellite crater Baillaud E in the western half. The crater interior lacks a central peak or significant ridges.

Nearby craters include the irregular Meton formation to the southwest, and Petermann further to the east. Due to its location, Baillaud appears oblong because of foreshortening along the line of sight to Earth.

Satellite craters
By convention these features are identified on lunar maps by placing the letter on the side of the crater midpoint that is closest to Baillaud.

See also 
 11764 Benbaillaud, asteroid named after Benjamin Baillaud 
 1280 Baillauda, asteroid named after his son, Jules Baillaud

References

External links

Image of the crater http://www.lpod.org/coppermine/displayimage.php?pos=-1571 

Impact craters on the Moon